The Ventura Oilers were a California League baseball team based in Ventura, California, USA that played from 1947 to 1953. They were affiliated with the San Francisco Seals of the Pacific Coast League in 1953, the Boston Braves from 1950 to 1952 and the New York Yankees from 1947 to 1949 and played their home games at Babe Ruth Field.

Notable players for the Ventura Oilers include Dick Adams, Dario Lodigiani and Dave Melton. Lodigiani also managed the team.
Bat Boys for the team included Robert and Frank Buck.

Notable major league players that played for the Ventura Braves included Gene Lillard, Bob Roselli and Bobby Sturgeon. Lillard and Sturgeon also managed the Ventura team.

The team became the Channel Cities Oilers in 1954 and then the Reno Silver Sox in 1955.

Notable alumni

Frank Lucchesi (1948-1949)
 Tom Morgan (1949)
Hal Smith (1949)

References

External links
Baseball Reference

Baseball teams established in 1947
Baseball teams disestablished in 1953
Defunct minor league baseball teams
Professional baseball teams in California
Boston Braves minor league affiliates
New York Yankees minor league affiliates
Defunct California League teams
1947 establishments in California
1953 disestablishments in California
Defunct baseball teams in California
Sports in Ventura County, California